Small green leafhopper (or leaf-hopper) may refer to:

 Empoasca flavescens
 Jacobiasca formosana, also known as the tea jassid